Towaunonne was a Sauk chief aligned with Black Hawk's British Band during the 1832 Black Hawk War.

British Band
Towaunonne was a Sauk and one of seven civil chiefs aligned with Black Hawk's British Band during the Black Hawk War in 1832.

References

Native American leaders
Native Americans of the Black Hawk War